Haji Lane is in the Kampong Glam neighbourhood of Singapore, a short walk from Bugis MRT. Young people frequent the shophouses along this lane for the independent stores and cafes, such as Pizza Fabbrica, Good Luck Beerhouse, and Monocle.

Haji Lane got its name because of the businesses here. There were many Arab pilgrim-brokers who would arrange the haj for Muslims in Singapore and from the nearby islands such as Java.

History  

1800s-1960s: The shophouses of Haji were most commonly used as lodges for Hajj pilgrims whilst on their journeys. During their stay, the pilgrims would work close by as hawkers in order to save enough money to continue the rest of their journeys.

1960s-1970s: Haji Lane provided shophouse homes for poorer Malay families. 

After 1970s: There were a lot of empty shophouses. The ones that were occupied were used as storage spaces.

References

External links
 Singapore Lane Springs to Life (New York Times)
 Clothes Quarter: Haji Lane (Singapore Tourism Board)
 Haji Lane Official Facebook Group 

Roads in Singapore
Odonyms referring to religion